Aşıqalılar (also, Ashgalar, Ashkallar, Ashygalylar, and Gadzhi-Kharrar) is a village and municipality in the Beylagan Rayon of Azerbaijan.  It has a population of 2,016.

References 

Populated places in Beylagan District